Jhon Jairo Espinoza Izquierdo (born 24 February 1999) is an Ecuadorian professional footballer who plays as a defender for Swiss Super League club Lugano and the Ecuador national team.

Club career
Born in Guayaquil, Espinoza began his career with Liga Pro club Cuenca, where he made his debut on 12 December 2017. A few games into the 2018 season, Espinoza moved to Aucas. He made his debut for the club on 30 July 2018 against Independiente Valle, starting in a 1–0 victory.

On 18 February 2020, Espinoza scored his first goal for Aucas in a 2–1 victory over Vélez Sarsfield in the Copa Sudamericana.

Chicago Fire
On 23 November 2020, Espinoza joined American Major League Soccer club Chicago Fire. He made his debut for the club on 24 June 2021 against Atlanta United, coming on as a late substitute in the 3–1 victory. On 27 December 2022, it was announced that Espinoza and Chicago had mutually agreed to terminate his deal immediately, and that he would join Swiss Super League side Lugano on 1 January 2023.

Lugano
On 27 December 2022, Espinoza signed a 1.5-year contract with Lugano in Switzerland.

International career
Espinoza captained the Ecuadorian under-20 team at the 2019 FIFA U-20 World Cup, and scored the winning goal in a 2–1 win over the United States in the quarter finals.

Espinoza made his senior debut in 2019. In a match against Argentina on 13 October 2019 Espinoza unfortunately scored an own goal in a 6–1 loss.

Career statistics

Club

International

References

External links
 Profile at Chicago Fire

1999 births
Living people
Sportspeople from Guayaquil
Ecuadorian footballers
Association football midfielders
C.D. Cuenca footballers
S.D. Aucas footballers
Chicago Fire FC players
Chicago Fire FC II players
FC Lugano players
Ecuadorian Serie A players
Ecuador international footballers
Ecuador under-20 international footballers
Ecuadorian expatriate footballers
Major League Soccer players
MLS Next Pro players
Swiss Super League players
Expatriate soccer players in the United States
Ecuadorian expatriate sportspeople in the United States
Expatriate footballers in Switzerland
Ecuadorian expatriate sportspeople in Switzerland